Cynomya is a genus in the family Calliphoridae of flies.

References

Calliphoridae
Oestroidea genera
Taxa named by Jean-Baptiste Robineau-Desvoidy